Kitchinganomodon is a genus of dicynodont from Late Permian (Wuchiapingian) of South Africa.

References

Dicynodonts
Permian tetrapods
Lopingian synapsids of Africa
Wuchiapingian genus first appearances
Anomodont genera